Yoon Duk-joo (June 23, 1921 in Korea – July 8, 2005 in South Korea) was a South Korean basketball administrator. She served as the Director of the Korea Basketball Association (1952–1954), President of the Women's Committee of the Asian Basketball Confederation (current FIBA Asia) (1986–1996), President of the Women's Commission of the FIBA (1986–1995) and Vice-President of the Korean Olympic Committee (1993–1997). In 1995, she was awarded the FIBA Order of Merit. She was enshrined as a contributor in the FIBA Hall of Fame in 2007.

External links
 FIBA Hall of Fame page on Yoon

FIBA Hall of Fame inductees
Basketball in South Korea
1921 births
2005 deaths